Richard Bridges  may refer to:

 Richard Brydges (1500–1558), English politician
Richard Bridges (organ builder) (died 1758), English organ builder
Richard J. Bridges, American pharmacologist